The Canadian Urban Institute is a not-for-profit organization based in Toronto, Ontario, Canada. It is mandated to pursue both national and international urban issues. The institute operates in several fields related to urban planning and is involved with specific issues such as affordable housing, the competitiveness of city regions, smart growth, energy and water solutions, age-friendly communities, and brownfield reclamation.

History 
The institute was established in 1990 by the Municipality of Metropolitan Toronto and the City of Toronto and led by veteran Toronto city councilor Richard Gilbert. Former Toronto mayor and federal cabinet minister, the Honourable David Crombie, served as its president and chief executive officer from 2001 to 2007. Crombie was followed in the position by former Winnipeg mayor Glen Murray. Murray stood down following his election to the Legislative Assembly of Ontario in 2010 and was succeeded by former Hamilton mayor Fred Eisenberger, who formally took office on February 7, 2011. Its current president and CEO is Mary W. Rowe.

Programs 
CUI holds conferences and seminars, conducts research, and produces publications on social and economic issues that impact the urban sector including social development, infrastructure, and sustainable housing. The organization presents annual Brownie Awards to groups that demonstrate leadership, environmental sustainability, and innovation.

In 2020, CUI created three online platforms to provide information about the COVID-19 pandemic: CityWatch Canada, CityShare Canada, and Bring Back Main Street.

In 2021, the institute launched My Main Street, a two-year program to revitalize cites' economies by providing small businesses with market research and $10,000.

International partnerships 
Over the course of its history, the institute had an active international program that works in partnership with cities and regions around the world to improve planning, urban management, service delivery, environmental management, and local economic development. CUI has been active in a range of countries including the Philippines, Ethiopia, Jamaica, Cuba, Honduras, Peru, Paraguay, Bosnia and Herzegovina, and countries within Central and Eastern Europe such as Ukraine, Poland, and Latvia. The CUI is helping to advance regional economic development in Ukraine, local economic development in the Philippines, local government reform in Jamaica, and improved urban management in Ethiopia.

References

External links 

 Official website

National institutes of urbanism
Non-profit organizations based in Toronto
Urban planning organizations
1990 establishments in Canada